Bak or BAK may refer to:

Computer
 Bak file
 Betrayal at Krondor, a DOS-based role-playing video game
 Bill and keep reciprocal payment in telecommunications systems

Acronyms
 Bcl-2 homologous antagonist killer, a protein involved in pro-apoptotic action
 Biking Across Kansas
 Basic Aeronautical Knowledge

Places
 Bäk, a municipality in the district of Lauenburg, in Schleswig-Holstein, Germany
 Bąk (disambiguation), several places in Poland
 Bak District, Afghanistan
 Bak, Hungary
 Bäk, Khost Province, Afghanistan
 Bak, South Khorasan, Iran

People
 Aad Bak (1926–2009), Dutch football player
 Arkadiusz Bąk (born 1974), Polish football player
 Bąk (surname), Polish surname
 Jacek Bąk (born 1973), Polish football player
 Justyna Bąk (born 1974), Polish long-distance runner
 Mateusz Bąk (born 1983), Polish football player
 Nisan Bak or Nissan Beck (1815–1889), Hasidic leader, moderniser and printer in Jerusalem; son of Israel Bak
 Per Bak (1948–2002), Danish physicist
 Samuel Bak (born 1933), Israeli artist
 Stéphane Bak (born 1996), French actor and radio host of Congolese descent
 Bek (sculptor) or Bak, ancient Egyptian sculptor
 Park (Korean surname) or Bak, common Korean family name
 Lauren Haney's Lieutenant Bak series set in Ancient Egypt
 Thomas Bak, German artist & art director

Transport
 Bakau LRT station (LRT station abbreviation: BAK) in Sengkang, Singapore
 Battersea Park railway station (3-Alpha station code: BAK) in London, UK
 Columbus Municipal Airport (Indiana) (FAA airport code: BAK), US airport
 Heydar Aliyev Airport (previous IATA airport code: BAK, has been changed to: GYD), in Baku, Azerbaijan

Others
 BAK (Austria), federal anti corruption agency
 BAK (magazine), online arts & design magazine
 Backup
 Bashkir language (ISO 639 identifier: bak)
 Bak (instrument), Korean wooden clapper
 '× Bakerara (abbreviation Bak), a genus of orchids
 BaK, World War I anti-balloon gun, from the German Ballonabwehrkanone  
 Benzalkonium chloride drug preservative